The following is a timeline of the history of the city of Asheville, North Carolina, USA.

Prior to 20th century

 1792 – Settlement established (approximate date).
 1793 – Log courthouse built.
 1797 – Town of Asheville incorporated; named after politician Samuel Ashe.
 1800 – Population: 38.
 1824 – Buncombe Turnpike built in vicinity of Asheville.
 1829 – Vance Circulating Library Society founded.
 1849 – Asheville News begins publication.
 1860 – Population: 502.
 1870
 North Carolina Citizen newspaper begins publication.
 Population: 1,400.
 1879 – Public Library opens.
 1880 – Western North Carolina Railroad begins operating.
 1882 – The first organized fire department is created, which will eventually become the Asheville Fire Department. 
 1883 – City of Asheville incorporated.
 1889 – Streetcar begins operating.
 1890 – Population: 10,235.
 1893 – Young Men's Institute Building constructed.
 1894 – Swannanoa Country Club founded.
 1895 – Biltmore Estate (residence) built near Asheville.
 1897 – Zebulon Baird Vance monument erected in Pack Square.
 1898
 Manor Hotel in business.
 Biltmore Forest School established near Asheville.
 1899 – Appalachian National Park Association formed during a meeting in Asheville.
 1900 – Future writer Thomas Wolfe born in Asheville.

20th century
1906 – Will Harris's murderous rampage
 1909
 St. Lawrence Church built.
 Palace Theatre in business.
 1913 – Grove Park Inn in business.
 1915 – Asheville Masonic Temple built.
 1917 – 
 West Asheville becomes part of the city of Asheville.
Nov. 16, a fire at Catholic Hill School for Colored Children killed seven and destroyed the building. Considered to be one of the worst disasters in Asheville history.
 1920 – Population: 28,504.
 1922 – Imperial Theatre in business.
 1924 – Hi-rise Jackson Building constructed.
 1925 – Memorial Stadium opens.
 1927
 WWNC radio begins broadcasting.
 First Baptist Church built.
 1928
 Asheville City Hall and Buncombe County Courthouse built.
 Dutch-owned Enka rayon manufactory begins operating near city.
 1929 – Kenilworth becomes part of Asheville.
 1930
 Southern Mountain Handicraft Guild founded.
 Population: 50,193.
 1934
 Bus begins operating.
 Great Smoky Mountains National Park established in vicinity of Asheville.
 1935 – Blue Ridge Parkway construction begins.
 1941 – Black Mountain College of art relocates to vicinity of Asheville.
 1948 – March 10: Highland Hospital fire; Zelda Fitzgerald among the fatalities.
 1952 – Western North Carolina Historical Association organized.
 1953 – WISE-TV (television) begins broadcasting.
 1954 – WLOS-TV (television) begins broadcasting.
 1959 – Asheville Industrial Education Center established.
 1961 – Asheville Regional Airport begins operating.
 1971 – Asheville Mall in business.
 1976 – Preservation Society of Asheville and Buncombe County organized.
 1978 – North Carolina Division of Archives and Records "Western Office" headquartered in Asheville.
 1979 – Old Buncombe County Genealogical Society formed.
 1980 – Population: 54,022.
 1983 – James M. Clarke becomes U.S. representative for North Carolina's 11th congressional district.
 1990 – Sister city agreement established with Vladikavkaz, Russia.
 1991 – Asheville Citizen-Times newspaper in publication.
 1994 – Sister city agreement established with San Cristóbal de las Casas, Mexico.
 1996 – Sister city agreement established with Saumur, France.
 1998 – City website online (approximate date).

21st century
 2000 – Population: 68,889.
 2003 – Asheville Film Festival begins.
 2004 – Sister city agreement established with Karpenisi, Greece.
 2005
 Terry Bellamy becomes first African-American in city elected mayor.
 Patrick McHenry becomes U.S. representative for North Carolina's 10th congressional district.
 2006 – Sister city agreement established with Valladolid, Mexico.
 2007 – Asheville-Buncombe Libraries changed name to Buncombe County Public Libraries.
 2008 – Sister city agreement established with Osogbo, Nigeria.
 2010 – Population: 83,393.
 2013 – Esther Manheimer becomes mayor.
2019 – Population: 92,870.

See also
 List of mayors of Asheville, North Carolina
 National Register of Historic Places listings in Buncombe County, North Carolina
 Timelines of other cities in North Carolina: Charlotte, Durham, Fayetteville, Greensboro, Raleigh, Wilmington, Winston-Salem

References

Bibliography

 
 
 
 
 
 
 

  (Includes information about Asheville)
 
 
 
 
 
 
 
 Chase, Nan K. 2007. Asheville, a history. Jefferson, NC: McFarland & Co.

External links

 
 Items related to Asheville, North Carolina, various dates (via Digital Public Library of America)
  (Subject guide)
 

Asheville, North Carolina
Asheville